Polyalthia hookeriana is a species of plant in the family Annonaceae. It is a tree found in Malaysia and Singapore.

References

hookeriana
Trees of Malaya
Least concern plants
Taxonomy articles created by Polbot
Taxobox binomials not recognized by IUCN